A steam wagon (or steam lorry, steam waggon or steamtruck) is a steam-powered truck for carrying freight. It was the earliest form of lorry (truck) and came in two basic forms: overtype and undertype, the distinction being the position of the engine relative to the boiler. Manufacturers tended to concentrate on one form or the other.

Steam wagons were a widespread form of powered road traction for commercial haulage in the early part of the twentieth century, although they were a largely British phenomenon, with few manufacturers outside Great Britain. Competition from internal-combustion-powered vehicles and adverse legislation meant that few remained in commercial use beyond the Second World War.

Although the majority of steam wagons have been scrapped, a significant number have been preserved in working order and may be seen in operation at steam fairs, particularly in the UK.

Design features
The steam wagon came in two basic forms. The overtype designs looked like a cross between a traction engine and a lorry. The front resembled a traction engine by having a cab built around a horizontal fire-tube boiler with a round smokebox and chimney (e.g. Foden). The back resembled a lorry in having a load-carrying body and being built around a chassis. (A traction engine is constructed around the boiler and has no separate chassis.)

The undertype designs have the engine under the chassis (although the boiler – usually a vertical type – remains in the cab), and generally resemble motor lorries rather than traction engines. Undertype designs often had the benefit of a more enclosed cab, and a much shorter length for the same carrying capacity.

The earliest examples of either type had steel or wooden wheels, later followed by solid rubber tyres. Various developments, such as fully enclosed cabs and pneumatic tyres, were later tried by companies in a bid to compete with internal combustion engine-powered lorries. Some wagons built to run on solid tyres were later converted to pneumatic tyres.

History

Early years

Following a relaxation in the legislation covering the use of steam-powered vehicles on common roads, manufacturers started to investigate the possibility of using steam power for a self-contained goods vehicle. Prior to this point, goods were carried in a trailer towed behind a traction engine, or more frequently a horse. The first steam wagon was produced in 1870 and occasional experiments continued over the next two decades.

Despite legislation that severely restricted the unladen weight of wagons, steam wagon production began to flourish in the UK in the last decade of the 19th century. Manufacturers such as the Lancashire Steam Motor Company (later Leyland), Coulthard, Mann, Straker and Thornycroft were among the companies that began producing wagons at this time.

In 1901, several makers competed in the Aldershot trials for the War Department, with Thornycroft's gear driven undertype coming out as the winner ahead of Foden's early chain driven overtype. Both manufacturers built on this early success, with Foden patenting the essential features of the overtype wagon and deterring other manufacturers from attempting such a design.

Around this time the Yorkshire Patent Steam Wagon company began producing undertype wagons with their distinctive pattern of double ended boiler. In this period, many manufacturers made attempts to build steam wagons, often with only moderate success.

Expansion

In 1906, Alley & McLellan launched the first Sentinel wagon, driven by a well designed, rugged engine with poppet valves, and an effective superheated vertical cross watertube boiler. It was a revolutionary design, and immediately took a large share of the market.

Also in 1906, Wallis & Steevens produced an overtype wagon that Foden viewed as an infringement of their patent. The matter led to a patent infringement case. In 1908 the matter was decided in Wallis & Steevens' favour, and upheld on appeal. This naturally led to a great expansion of overtype wagon production, with prominent traction engine companies drawing on their experience building steam tractors to produce wagons, with varying success.

The great transport demands of the World War I led to several of the premier wagon manufacturers – at the time, Sentinel, Clayton & Shuttleworth, Foden and Garrett, having almost their entire production ordered directly for the war effort. This opened up the home market for many other manufacturers to fill the vacuum. A company that entered the market in this period was Atkinson, with their undertype wagon design launched in 1916.

Zenith

In the immediate post war era, several manufacturers who had previously been producing overtypes switched their focus to undertypes, attempting to compete with Sentinel. Among these companies were Claytons and Garrett. In 1922 Foden began producing the celebrated C-type overtype. It was not a revolutionary wagon, but had improvements such as a better driving position and the option of a windscreen. In 1923, Sentinel launched a much updated wagon, the "Super" Sentinel. In 1924, Fowler made their attempt to enter the undertype market. The various undertypes of the era were frequently fitted with windscreens to improve crew comfort.
In the early 1920s, in an attempt to circumvent the weight regulations of the period and allow a higher capacity, several companies had experimented with the idea of an articulated trailer. With the brake and tyre technology of the era, such designs were often found to be difficult to control, with a propensity for jackknifing. In 1926, Garrett produced a rigid six wheeled wagon. Both Sentinel and Foden quickly brought out six wheelers, and these became a large percentage of the output of these manufacturers for the remainder of steam wagon production.

Around this period, Foden made several attempts to build undertypes, with the E-type being largely a failure. Yorkshire produced the updated "WG", "WH" (shaft drive) and "WJ" (six wheeler) wagons

The last stand

By the beginning of the 1930s, the landscape was becoming difficult for steam wagon production. Many manufacturers had gone out of business, and many others had turned to internal combustion. The only major manufacturers who produced new designs in this period were Foden and Sentinel. In 1930, Foden launched their revolutionary "O-Type", better known as the "Speed-Six" and "Speed-Twelve" wagons. They were a valiant attempt at producing a modern steam wagon, but suffered from reliability problems, primarily due to issues with the boiler design. At the end of 1932, Foden turned to diesel wagons. The last french producer was Valentin Purrey who ceased production in 1929. 

The only remaining player in the market was Sentinel. In 1933, they launched their "S" type wagons. A fast, well thought out and reliable design, it was a valiant attempt to maintain the steam wagon market. Despite this, in 1938, production ceased, except for 100 wagons produced in the early 1950s for the Argentine government, and a solitary wagon produced for the home market.

Pat Kennett in his book The Foden Story says of the final years of steam wagon development: "The sight of a steam wagon travelling at speeds in the 40-50 mph bracket or higher was particularly impressive, perhaps because one tended to associate this kind of machine with a more sedate pace altogether. Nevertheless anyone who has seen a Sentinel or a Foden undertype with a full load, bowling along in complete silence at that kind of speed is never likely to forget it and, to many steam men, those brief years at the end of the '20s and the beginning of the '30s represented the pinnacle of achievement in the steam wagon industry".

Commercial use

While steam wagon use greatly diminished in the 1930s due to the effects of the Salter Report, many wagons were converted to pneumatic tyres and saw later use. Another use, where wagons often retained solid tyres, was as tar sprayers. Steam wagons also saw use by local authorities into the 1950s. Standard Sentinel waggons were still in commercial use internally at Brown Bayley Steels during the 1960s.

Disappearance

Road steam disappeared through becoming uneconomical to operate, and unpopular with British governments. By 1921, steam tractors had demonstrated clear economic advantages over horse power for heavy hauling and short journeys. However, petrol lorries were starting to show better efficiency and could be purchased cheaply as war surplus; on a busy route a 3-ton petrol lorry could save about £100 per month compared to its steam equivalent, in spite of restrictive speed limits, and relatively high fuel prices and maintenance costs.

Throughout the 1920s and 1930s successive governments placed tighter restrictions on road steam haulage, including smoke and vapour limits.

As a result of the Salter Report on road funding, an 'axle weight tax' was introduced in 1933 in order to charge commercial motor vehicles more for the costs of maintaining the road system, and to do away with the perception that the free use of roads was subsidising the competitors of rail freight. The tax was payable by all road hauliers in proportion to the axle load; it was particularly damaging to steam propulsion, which was heavier than its petrol equivalent.

Initially, imported oil was taxed much more than British-produced coal, but in 1934 Oliver Stanley, the Minister for Transport, reduced taxes on fuel oils while raising the Road Fund charge on road locomotives to £100 a year, provoking protests by engine manufacturers, hauliers, showmen and the coal industry. This was at a time of high unemployment in the mining industry, when the steam haulage business represented a market of 950,000 tons of coal annually. The tax was devastating to the businesses of heavy hauliers and showmen, and precipitated the scrapping of many engines.

Steam wagon manufacturers

There were almost 160 manufacturers of steam wagons.

Many traction engine builders also built forms of steam lorry, but some firms specialised in them.

John I. Thornycroft & Company was an established marine engineering company that successfully spawned the Steam Carriage and Wagon Company for the production of steam-powered road vehicles. They supplied steam lorries to the British Army, commercial steam wagons and vans, steam cars (for a few years), and buses – London's first powered bus was a Thornycroft double-decker steam bus.

Manufacturers who were significant producers of steam lorries include:
 Aveling & Porter Ltd., Rochester, Kent
 Bristol Wagon & Carriage Works Ltd., Lawrence Hill, Bristol - Built steam wagons from 1904 to 1908.
 Charles Burrell & Sons Ltd., St Nicholas Works, Thetford
 Clayton Wagons Ltd., Lincoln
 Fodens Ltd., Elworth Works, Sandbach, Cheshire
 Leyland Steam Motor Co., Leyland, Lancashire - Founded in 1896-1907, then became Leyland Motors Ltd (steam wagons built until 1926).
 Mann's Patent Steam Cart and Wagon Company, Hunslet, Leeds
 Richard Garrett & Sons, Leiston, Suffolk
 Robey & Co., Globe Works, Lincoln
 Sentinel Waggon Works Ltd., Shrewsbury, Shropshire
 Sheppee Motor & Engineering Co. Ltd., Thomas St., York - Briefly built steam cars.
 Straker Steam Vehicle Company Ltd., Bristol
 The Thornycroft Steam Carriage and Wagon Company (later Thornycroft), Basingstoke
 Wallis & Steevens, Hampshire Iron Works, Basingstoke, Hants.
 Yorkshire Patent Steam Wagon Co., Hunslet, Leeds

Outside UK:
 Hanomag (Germany)
 Henschel (Germany)

In popular culture

The 1928 film The Wrecker features a spectacular crash between a passenger train and a Foden steam lorry stuck on a level crossing.

See also
 History of steam road vehicles
 Steam bus
 Steam car
 Traction engine
 Showman's road locomotive

References

Further reading

 

 

 

Trucks
Wagon